The duckbill conger (Gavialiceps javanicus) is an eel in the family Muraenesocidae (pike congers). It was described by Emma Stanislavovna Karmovskaya in 1993. It is a marine, deep water-dwelling eel which is known from the Indo-West Pacific, including northwestern Australia, Java (from which the species epithet is derived), and Indonesia. It dwells at a depth range of 560–600 metres. Males can reach a maximum total length of 89 centimetres.

References

Muraenesocidae
Fish described in 1993